Todd Lake or Lake Todd may refer to:

Lake Todd (Minnesota)
Todd Lake (Oregon)
Lake Todd (South Dakota)